The Electricity Act 1957 (repealed 1989) was an Act of Parliament of the United Kingdom. The principal impact of the Act was the dissolution of the Central Electricity Authority (UK), which it replaced with the Central Electricity Generating Board (CEGB) and the Electricity Council.

The Electricity Act 1947, which nationalised the industry, set up the British Electricity Authority (BEA) and 14 Area Boards; it also established a Consultative Council for each of the Area Boards. Two of the Area Boards served the south of Scotland. These were formed, together with the BEA's generation activities in the region, into the South of Scotland Electricity Board (SSEB) by the Electricity Reorganisation (Scotland) Act 1954, under which the BEA was renamed the Central Electricity Authority. The north of Scotland has been served since 1943 by the North of Scotland Hydro-Electric Board (NSHEB).

The principal innovation of the Electricity Act 1957 was the Electricity Council; however, this Act also turned the Central Electricity Authority into the Central Electricity Generating Board (CEGB).

The statutory bodies created by it had the following key responsibilities:
 The CEGB was required to develop and maintain an efficient, co-ordinated and economical system of supply of electricity in bulk to all parts of England and Wales. To this end it generated electricity and transmitted it, through the high voltage power lines and cables of its national grid, to Area Boards and direct to a few large industrial users;
 the 12 Area Boards in England and Wales (as created by the Electricity Act 1947) bought bulk supplies of electricity from the CEGB and distributed it to consumers in their area;
 the Electricity Council, the co-ordinating body of the electricity supply industry, advised the Secretary of State on matters affecting the industry, and promoted and assisted the development and maintenance by the CEGB and Area Boards of an efficient, co-ordinated and economical system of electricity supply;
 the 12 Electricity Consultative Councils represented the interests of consumers in their area, and monitored the Area Boards' standards of service; and
 the Electricity Consumers' Council represented consumer interests at the national level, and could make representations concerning them to the ESI and to the Secretary of State. It had to be informed by the Electricity Council of the general plans and arrangements of both the Electricity Council and the CEGB, and, in particular, of any proposal by the CEGB to vary a tariff.

See also
 Electricity Act 1947
 Electricity Act 1989
 British Electricity Authority
 Timeline of the UK electricity supply industry
 List of pre-nationalisation UK electric power companies
 Public electricity supplier

External links
Official text of the Act as enacted in 1957, at the Office of Public Sector Information

References

United Kingdom Acts of Parliament 1957
Electric power companies of the United Kingdom
Repealed United Kingdom Acts of Parliament
Electric power in the United Kingdom